is a Japanese new religion which is neither strictly monotheistic nor pantheistic, originating from the teachings of a 19th-century woman named Nakayama Miki, known to her followers as "Oyasama". Followers of Tenrikyo believe that God of Origin, God in Truth, known by several names including "Tsukihi," "Tenri-Ō-no-Mikoto" and "Oyagamisama (God the Parent)" revealed divine intent through Miki Nakayama as the Shrine of God and to a lesser extent the roles of the Honseki Izo Iburi and other leaders. Tenrikyo's worldly aim is to teach and promote the Joyous Life, which is cultivated through acts of charity and mindfulness called .

It has 1.75 million followers in Japan and is estimated to have over 2 million worldwide.

Beliefs
The ultimate spiritual aim of Tenrikyo is the construction of the Kanrodai, a divinely ordained pillar in an axis mundi called the Jiba, and the correct performance of the Kagura ritual around the Kanrodai, which will bring about the salvation of all human beings. The idea of the Jiba as the origin of earthly creation is called , or the principle of origin. A pilgrimage to the Jiba is interpreted as a return to one's origin, so the greeting  ('welcome home') is seen on many inns in Tenri City.

Other key teachings include:
  – a constructive attitude towards troubles, illness and difficulties

Joyous Life

The Joyous Life in Tenrikyo is defined as charity and abstention from greed, selfishness, hatred, anger, covetousness, miserliness, grudge bearing, and arrogance. Negative tendencies are not known as sins in Tenrikyo, but rather as "dust" that can be swept away from the mind through  and prayer.

Ontology
The thing that is lent and borrowed is the human body. Tenrikyo followers think of their minds as things that are under their own control, but their bodies are not completely under their control.

God

Tenri-Ō-no-Mikoto created humankind so that humans may live joyously and to partake in that joy. The body is a thing borrowed, but the mind alone is one's own, thus it is commonly accepted that Tenri-Ō-no-Mikoto is not omnipotent.

Other gods are considered instruments, such as the Divine Providences, and were also created by Tenri-Ō-no-Mikoto.

Tenrikyo's doctrine names four properties of Tenri-O-no-Mikoto: as the God who became openly revealed in the world, as the creator who created the world and humankind, as the sustainer and protector who gives existence and life to all creation, and as the savior whose intention in becoming revealed is to save all humankind.

The moon and sun could be understood as visual manifestations of the divine. Just as those bodies impartially give the world light and warmth at all times of the day, the workings of the divine are also impartial and constant.
The relationship between the divine and human beings is the mutual feeling of love between a parent and his or her children. The divine does not want to command and punish human beings, but rather to guide and nurture them so that they may live joyfully and cheerfully together.  is both paternal and maternal, not simply one or the other.

These steps have been described as an "unfolding in the revelation of God's nature in keeping with the developing capacity of human understanding, from an all-powerful God, to a nourishing God, and finally to an intimate God."

Followers use the phrase  to refer to God, and the divine name "Tenri-O-no-Mikoto" when praising or worshipping God through prayer or ritual.

Causality

Comparison to karmic belief

Although causality resembles karmic beliefs found in religious traditions originating in ancient India, such as Hinduism, Buddhism and Jainism, Tenrikyo's doctrine does not claim to inherit the concept from these traditions and differs from their explanations of karma in a few significant ways.

Broadly speaking, karma refers to the spiritual principle of cause and effect where intent and actions of an individual (cause) influence the future of that individual (effect). In other words, a person's good intent and good deed contribute to good karma and future happiness, while bad intent and bad deed contribute to bad karma and future suffering. Causality and karma are interchangeable in this sense; throughout life a person may experience good and bad causality. In Tenrikyo, the concept is encapsulated in the farming metaphor, "every seed sown will sprout." Karma is closely associated with the idea of rebirth, such that one's past deeds in the current life and in all previous lives are reflected in the present moment, and one's present deeds are reflected in the future of the current life and in all future lives. This understanding of rebirth is upheld in causality as well.

Tenrikyo's ontology, however, differs from older karmic religious traditions such as Buddhism. In Tenrikyo, the human person is believed to consist of mind, body, and soul. The mind, which is given the freedom to sense, feel, and act by God the Parent, ceases to function at death. Though the reborn person has no memory of the previous life, the person's thoughts and deeds leave their mark on the soul and are carried over into the new life as the person's causality. As can be seen, Tenrikyo's ontology, which rests on the existence on a single creator deity (God the Parent), differs from Buddhist ontology, which does not contain a creator deity. Also Tenrikyo's concept of salvation, which is to live the Joyous Life in this existence and therefore does not promise a liberated afterlife outside of this existence, differs from Buddhist concepts of saṃsāra and nirvana.

"Original causality"
Tenrikyo teaches that the Joyous Life will eventually encompass all humanity, and that gradual progress towards the Joyous Life is even now being made with the guidance of divine providence. Thus the concept of original causality has a teleological element, being the gradual unfolding of that which was ordained at the beginning of time.

"Individual causality"
Belief in individual causality is related to the principle of original causality. Individual causality is divine providence acting to realize the original causality of the human race, which through the use of suffering guides individuals to realize their causality and leads them to a change of heart and active cooperation towards the establishment of the Joyous Life, the world that was ordained at the beginning of time.

Tenrikyo's doctrine explains that an individual's suffering should not be perceived as punishment or retributive justice from divine providence for past misdeeds, but rather as a sign of encouragement from divine providence for the individual to reflect on the past and to undergo a change of heart. In other words, Tenrikyo emphasizes the importance of maintaining a positive inner disposition, as opposed to a disposition easily swayed by external circumstance.

"Three causalities"
In addition, The Doctrine of Tenrikyo names  that are believed to predetermine the founding of Tenrikyo's teachings. More precisely, these causalities are the fulfillment of the promise that God made to the models and instruments of creation, which was that "when the years equal to the number of their first born had elapsed, they would be returned to the Residence of Origin, the place of original conception, and would be adored by their posterity." The "Causality of the Soul of Oyasama" denotes that Miki Nakayama had the soul of the original mother at creation (Izanami-no-Mikoto), who conceived, gave birth to, and nurtured humankind. The "Causality of the Residence" means that the Nakayama Residence, where Tenrikyo Church Headquarters stands, is the place that humankind was conceived. The "Causality of the Promised Time" indicates that October 26, 1838 – the day when God became openly revealed through Miki Nakayama – marked the time when the years equal to the number of first-born humans (900,099,999) had elapsed since the moment humankind was conceived.

Texts

Scriptures

The  is the most important Tenrikyo scripture.

The  is a written record of oral revelations given by Izo Iburi. The full scripture is published in seven volumes (plus an index in three volumes) and contains around 20,000 "divine directions" delivered between January 4, 1887 and June 9, 1907.

According to Shozen Nakayama, the second  (the spiritual and administrative leader of Tenrikyo), the  "reveal[s] the most important principles of the faith," the Mikagura-uta "come[s] alive through singing or as the accompaniment" to the Service, and the Osashizu "gives concrete precepts by which the followers should reflect on their own conduct."

Supplemental texts to the scriptures
The  are officially sanctioned texts which, along with the scriptures, are used to instruct students and adherents of Tenrikyo. They are required texts for students enrolling in Tenrikyo's seminary programs, such as the three-month .

The Doctrine of Tenrikyo is Tenrikyo's official doctrine, which explains the basic teachings of Tenrikyo. The Life of Oyasama, Foundress of Tenrikyo is Tenrikyo's hagiography of Miki Nakayama. The Anecdotes of Oyasama, Foundress of Tenrikyo is an anthology of anecdotes about Nakayama that were passed down orally by her first followers and later written down and verified.

Organization 

Tenrikyo is subdivided into many different groups with common goals but differing functions.

Tenri Judo is renowned as a successful competition style of Judo that has produced many champions, while there are also other sporting and arts interest groups within Tenrikyo.

History

In Tenrikyo tradition, Miki Nakayama was chosen as the Shrine of God in 1838, after her son and husband began suffering from serious ailments. The family called a Buddhist monk to exorcise the spirit causing the ailments. When the monk temporarily left and asked Nakayama to take over, she was possessed by the One god (Tenri-O-no-Mikoto), who demanded that Nakayama be given to God as a shrine. Nakayama's husband gave in to this request three days later.

Nakayama's statements and revelations as Shrine of God were supplemented by Izo Iburi, one of her earliest followers, who developed a position of revelatory leadership as her deputy, answering questions from followers and giving "timely talks". His position, which is no longer held in Tenrikyo, was called .

Nakayama's eldest son obtained a license to practice as a low-ranking Shinto priest from the powerful Yoshida branch of Shinto in 1867, but did so against his mother's wishes. Tenrikyo was designated as one of the thirteen groups included in Sect Shinto between 1908 and 1945 under State Shinto. During this time, Tenrikyo became the first new religion to do social work in Japan, opening an orphanage, a public nursery and a school for the blind.

Although Tenrikyo is now completely separate from Shinto and Buddhism organizationally, it still shares many of the traditions of Japanese religious practice.

Timeline

 1798, April 18 (lunar calendar) – Miki Nakayama was born.
 1838, December 12 (October 26, lunar calendar) – God was revealed to Nakayama at the Mishima Shrine.
 1854 – Nakayama begins to administer the Grant for Safe Childbirth, and thus begins to recruit her first followers.
 1866 – First chapters of  appear.
 1887, January 26 (lunar calendar)  – the death of Nakayama.
 1908 – official recognition as one of the thirteen branches of Sect Shinto.

Religious services

Daily services
The daily service is performed twice a day; once in the morning and then in the evening. The service times are adjusted according to the time of sun rise and sun set but may vary from church to church. Service times at the Jiba in Tenri City go by this time schedule and adjust in the changing of seasons.

The  is always played by the head minister of the church or mission station. If the head minister is not present, anyone may take their place.

The daily service does not need to be performed at a church. It can be done at any time and anywhere, so long as that one faces the direction of the Jiba, or "home of the parent".

The purpose of the daily service, as taught by Nakayama, is to sweep away the Eight Mental Dusts of the mind.

is a spontaneous action that is an expression of gratitude and joy for being allowed to "borrow" his or her body from God the Parent. Such an action ideally is done as an act of religious devotion out of a wish to help or bring joy to others, without any thought of compensation.  can range from helping someone to just a simple smile to brighten another person's day. Examples of common  activities that are encouraged include cleaning public bathrooms and parks among other such acts of community service. Doing the work that others want to do least are considered sincere in the eyes of God.

 is a method of "sweeping" the "mental dusts" that accumulate in a person's mind. The "mental dusts" are referring to the Eight Mental Dusts.

The Tenrikyo Young Men's Association and Tenrikyo Women's Association are Tenrikyo-based groups that perform group activities as public service. To participate in such groups may be considered .

Monthly services

 or the monthly service is a performance of the entire , the sacred songs of the service, which is the service for world salvation. Generally, mission headquarters and grand churches (churches with 100 or more others under them) have monthly services performed on the third Sunday of every month; other churches perform on any other Sunday of the month. The monthly service at the Jiba is performed on the 26th of every month, the day of the month in which Tenrikyo was first conceived – October 26, 1838.

Instruments used in the monthly service are all of those aforementioned. Performers also include dancers – three men and three women – and a singer. Performers wear traditional  kimono, which may or may not be required depending on the church.

Divine Grant of 

The  is to be administered to those who are suffering from illness to request God's blessings for a recovery. This is accomplished through having the recipient be aware of the mental dusts and the teachings of Tenrikyo to remedy their dusty minds.

Tenrikyo centers outside Japan
In recent years Tenrikyo has spread outside Japan, with foreign branches centered primarily in Southeast Asia and America. Tenrikyo maintains centers in:
 Argentina: Buenos Aires
 Australia: Brisbane, Melbourne
 Brazil: Bauru
 Canada: Vancouver
 China: Hong Kong
 Colombia: Cali, Bogotá, Medellín
 France: Paris
 Mexico: Mexico City
 Philippines: Makati, Manila, Laguna

 Taiwan: Taipei
 Thailand: Bangkok
 United Kingdom: Leeds, London
 United States: Hawaii, Los Angeles, Seattle New York City San Francisco

Notable followers

 Avram Davidson – American writer of speculative fiction and crime fiction
 Ayaka Hirahara – Japanese pop singer
 Naoki Matsuyo – Japanese association footballer
 Ronnie Nyogetsu Reishin Seldin – Japanese  player

See also

 Religion in Japan
 Tenri University

Notes

References

External links 

 Tenrikyo International Website
 "Tenrikyō" from World Religions & Spirituality Project

 
1838 establishments in Japan
Monotheistic religions
Religion in Japan
Religious organizations established in 1838
Japanese new religions
Shinto new religious movements
13 Shinto Sects